The Jason Baronetcy, of Broad Somerford in the County of Wiltshire, was a title in the Baronetage of England.  It was created on 5 September 1661 for Robert Jason.  The title became extinct on the death of the sixth Baronet in 1738.

Jason baronets, of Broad Somerford (1661)

Sir Robert Jason, 1st Baronet (died )
Sir Robert Jason, 2nd Baronet (1640 – c. 1687)
Sir George Jason, 3rd Baronet (died c. 1697)
Sir Robert Jason, 4th Baronet (died c. 1723)
Sir Warren Jason, 5th Baronet (c. 1705 – 1728)
Sir Robert Jason, 6th Baronet (c. 1708 – 1738)

References

Extinct baronetcies in the Baronetage of England